Gouri is a village in the Kougny Department of Nayala Province in western Burkina Faso. As of 2003, the village had a population of 1182.

References

Populated places in the Boucle du Mouhoun Region
Nayala Province